Grzegorz Pająk (born 1 January 1987) is a Polish professional volleyball player, a bronze medallist at the 2015 European League. At the professional club level, he plays for Indykpol AZS Olsztyn.

Honours

Clubs
 National championships
 2009/2010  Polish Cup, with Jastrzębski Węgiel
 2015/2016  Polish Championship, with ZAKSA Kędzierzyn-Koźle
 2016/2017  Polish Cup, with ZAKSA Kędzierzyn-Koźle
 2016/2017  Polish Championship, with ZAKSA Kędzierzyn-Koźle

References

External links
 
 Player profile at PlusLiga.pl 
 Player profile at Volleybox.net

1987 births
Living people
People from Stalowa Wola
Polish men's volleyball players
Polish expatriate sportspeople in France
Expatriate volleyball players in France
Polish expatriate sportspeople in Turkey
Expatriate volleyball players in Turkey
Polish expatriate sportspeople in Russia
Expatriate volleyball players in Russia
BBTS Bielsko-Biała players
Jastrzębski Węgiel players
Effector Kielce players
AZS Olsztyn players
ZAKSA Kędzierzyn-Koźle players
Warta Zawiercie players
MKS Będzin players
LKPS Lublin players
Cuprum Lubin players
Setters (volleyball)